Jóvenes Somos is a studio album from American Evan Craft. It was released on August 16, 2014 on Craft's own Evan Craft Music label.

Critical reception

Joshua Andre, in a three and a half star review for 365 Days of Inspiring Media, wrote:

Track listing

References

2014 albums
Evan Craft albums